PeerJ is an open access peer-reviewed scientific mega journal covering research in the biological and medical sciences. It is published by a company of the same name that was co-founded by CEO Jason Hoyt (formerly at Mendeley) and publisher Peter Binfield (formerly at PLOS One), with initial financial backing of US$950,000 from O'Reilly Media's O'Reilly AlphaTech Ventures, and later funding from Sage Publishing. 

PeerJ officially launched in June 2012, started accepting submissions on December 3, 2012, and published its first articles on February 12, 2013. The company is a member of CrossRef, CLOCKSS, ORCID, and the Open Access Scholarly Publishers Association. The company's offices are in Corte Madera (California, USA), and London (Great Britain).  Submitted research is judged solely on scientific and methodological soundness (as at PLoS ONE), with a facility for peer reviews to be published alongside each paper.

Business model 
PeerJ uses a business model that differs from traditional publishers – in that no subscription fees are charged to its readers – and initially differed from the major open-access publishers in that publication fees were not levied per article but per publishing researcher and at a much lower level. PeerJ also offered a preprint service named PeerJ Preprints (launched on April 3, 2013 and discontinued in September 2019). The low costs were said to be in part achieved by using cloud infrastructure: both PeerJ and PeerJ Preprints run on Amazon EC2, with the content stored on Amazon S3.

Originally, PeerJ charged a one-time membership fee to authors that allowed them—with some additional requirements, such as commenting upon, or reviewing, at least one paper per year—to publish in the journal for life.

Since October 2016, PeerJ has reverted to article processing charges, but still offers the lifetime membership subscription as an alternative option. The current charge for non-members publishing a single article in PeerJ is $1,195.00, regardless of the number of authors. Alternatively, the life-time membership permitting one free paper per year for life is $399 per author (basic membership) or five per year for $499 (premium membership). It may sometimes be cheaper to pay the per publication charge than paying membership fees for all authors.

Reception 
The journal is abstracted and indexed in Science Citation Index Expanded, PubMed, PubMed Central, Scopus, Web of Science, Google Scholar, the DOAJ, the American Chemical Society (ACS) databases, EMBASE, CAB Abstracts, Europe PubMed Central, AGORA, ARDI, HINARI, OARE, the ProQuest databases, and OCLC. According to the Journal Citation Reports, its impact factor increased from 2.118 in 2017 to 2.353 in 2018.

In April 2013 The Chronicle of Higher Education selected PeerJ CEO and co-founder Jason Hoyt as one of "Ten Top Tech Innovators" for the year.

On September 12, 2013 the Association of Learned and Professional Society Publishers awarded PeerJ the "Publishing Innovation" of the year award.

Computer science and chemistry journals 
On 3 February 2015, PeerJ launched a new journal dedicated to computer science: PeerJ Computer Science.
The first article on PeerJ Computer Science was published on 27 May 2015.

On 6 November 2018, PeerJ launched five new journals dedicated to chemistry: PeerJ Physical Chemistry, PeerJ Organic Chemistry, PeerJ Inorganic Chemistry, PeerJ Analytical Chemistry, and PeerJ Materials Science.

See also 
arXiv
eLife

References

External links 
 
PeerJ PrePrints
PeerJ Computer Science

Creative Commons Attribution-licensed journals
Publications established in 2013
Science and technology in London
Science and technology in the San Francisco Bay Area
English-language journals
Biology journals
General medical journals
Open access publishers
Continuous journals
Academic publishing companies
O'Reilly Media